is a Japanese animation studio. It is the first studio to produce boys' love or BL (male-male romance) anime exclusively.

History
Grizzly was established on December 25, 2017, and formally unveiled at Anime Japan on March 23, 2018, with the announcement that the studio would adapt Yarichin Bitch Club into a series of original video animations (OVAs).

An affiliation between Grizzly and MAPPA has been reported, after the MAPPA Twitter account posted and deleted material that was later posted on the Grizzly account, and after the Grizzly website was found to be registered using a MAPPA email. , neither MAPPA nor Grizzly have commented on a link between their studios.

Works

Anime films

OVAs and OADs

References

External links
  

Animation studios in Tokyo
 
Japanese animation studios
Japanese companies established in 2017
LGBT in anime and manga
LGBT-related mass media in Japan
Mass media companies established in 2017
Yaoi